The Enggano language, or Engganese, is an Austronesian language spoken on Enggano Island off the southwestern coast of Sumatra, Indonesia.

Enggano is notable among the Austronesian languages of western Insular Southeast Asia because of many unusual sound changes, and a low number of words shared with other Austronesian languages. There is however general consensus among Austronesianists that Enggano belongs to the Austronesian language family. Failure to fully identify the inherited Austronesian elements in the basic lexicon and bound morphology of Enggano resulted in occasional proposals that Enggano might be a language isolate which had adopted Austronesian loanwords.

When first contacted by Europeans, the Enggano people had more cultural commonalities with indigenous peoples of the Nicobar Islands than with those of Austronesian Sumatra. For instance, beehive houses were typical of both Enggano Island and the Nicobar Islands. However, there are no apparent linguistic connections with Nicobarese or other Austroasiatic languages.

Classification
The classification of Enggano is controversial, ranging from proposals that negate its inclusion in the Austronesian family all the way to classifications that place Enggano in the Northwest Sumatra–Barrier Islands subgroup together with other Austronesian languages of the area (e.g. Nias). 

Based on the low number of apparent Austronesian cognates, Capell (1982) concludes that Enggano is a language isolate rather than Austronesian as previously assumed. Blench (2014) considers Enggano to be a language isolate that has picked up Austronesian loanwords, and notes many basic vocabulary items in Enggano are of non-Austronesian origin. Based on lexical evidence from the Enggano language, he considers the Enggano people to be descendants of Pleistocene (pre-Neolithic) hunter-gatherers that had preceded the Austronesians.

Edwards (2015) demonstrates that pronouns, numerals and many affixes in Enggano can be directly derived from Proto-Malayo-Polynesian. Based on this evidence, together with regular sound changes from Proto-Malayo-Polynesian to Enggano, Edwards concludes that Enggano clearly belongs to the Malayo-Polynesian branch of the Austronesian languages. Within Malayo-Polynesian, he considers Enggano to be a primary branch.

Edwards thus rejects Capell's and Blench's proposal that Enggano is a non-Austronesian language with Austronesian loanwords, and considers it to be clearly Austronesian. While a large portion of its lexicon obviously cannot be derived from Proto-Malayo-Polynesian, it remains unclear whether this represents a non-Austronesian substratum from an unknown source language, or the result of internally-driven lexical replacement. He notes that Enggano possesses many aberrant phonological features (such as a small phonological inventory) and a low lexical retention rate, which is more typical of Austronesian languages spoken in eastern Indonesia and Melanesia than rather than those of western Indonesia. Enggano's lexical retention rate (i.e., percentage of lexical items that are cognate with reconstructed Proto-Austronesian forms) is only 21% (46 out of 217 words), while the lexical retention rate for Malay is 59% (132.5 out of 223 words). Some non-Austronesian languages in Southeast Asia, such as Nancowry, Semelai, and Abui also have low lexical retention rates.

Evolution
Enggano has historically undergone several sound changes which are more far-reaching than changes observed in other Malayo-Polyesian languages of the area. These include for example (PMP = Proto-Malayo-Polynesian):
 PMP *ŋ > h   ( > )
 PMP *m > b   ( > )
 PMP *n > d   ( > )
 PMP *s > k   ( > )
 PMP *t > k   ( > )

As for the last shift, Enggano is the only western Austronesian language in which it is found, while the same change occurred independently several times in Oceanic after *k shifted to glottal stop.

An unusual feature is nasal harmony in its identifiable Austronesian vocabulary, where all stop consonants and vowels in a word became nasal after a nasal vowel, and oral after an oral vowel, so that there is no longer a phonemic distinction between them. Malay).

Phonology 
The only major linguistic treatment of Enggano was conducted by Hans Kähler in 1937. He published a grammar (1940), a text collection (1955, 1957, 1958, 1960a, 1960b, 1961, 1962, 1964, 1975) and a dictionary (1987). However, the discussion of phonology is limited to a simple inventory and a short paragraph of basic features. The grammar and dictionary disagree with each other, and the dictionary is not consistentː some words are not legible, and doubts have been raised about the accuracy of the transcriptions. Nothofer (1992) discusses loanwords and also lists phonemes. Yoder (2011) is a thesis on Enggano vowels, with some comments on consonants; it will be followed here. 

Note that contemporary Enggano, as discussed in Yoder (2011) and Nothofer (1992), has undergone several changes from Old Enggano, as documented by Kähler, including the fact that final vowels are regularly lost (e.g. e-papa 'cheek' becomes pap) and the split of the phoneme /o/. These have an effect on the phonology. 

Yoder and Nothofer report seven oral and seven nasal vowels:

Vowels do not occur word-initially in Enggano apart from what Yoder analyzes as  before another vowel; these are then pronounced as semivowels . Diphthongs lower to  etc. before a coda stop, as in  'ten', and undergo metathesis when that stop is glottal, as in  'twenty'. An intrusive vowel  appears between glottal stop and another consonant (though not semivowels), as in  'female leader'; this does not affect the pattern of stress.

The offglide of diphthongs lowers before glottal consonants, and a glottal stop may intrude when another word follows, as in   'another'.

Yoder notes that the voiced stops  are in complementary distribution, depending on whether the word has nasal vowels, but lists them separately. Voiced oral consonants, do not occur in words with nasal consonants or vowels. For example, with the oral stem  'bag', the possessive forms are  'my bag' and  'your bag', but with the nasal stem 'age', the forms are  'my age' and ’ 'your age'.

The resulting  may actually be , as most such words are attested with alternation like  'box'. When a suffix is added, so that this consonant is no longer word-final, it becomes , as in ’ 'my bag' above.

However, Yoder states that at the time of his research in 2010 there were no differences among the six villages on Enggano Island, and that initial  and final  are rare in native words.

Stress was once reported to be penultimate but now appears to occur on the final syllable. Alternating syllables preceding it have secondary stress.

Grammar
The main reference on the syntax and morphology of the Enggano language is the grammar produced by Hans Kähler. There are also some references to syntax and morphology in more recent work, such as Yoder (2011) and Edwards (2015). This section compares some of the findings in Kähler (1940) with those of Yoder (2011), where the language appears to have undergone some changes.

Pronouns 
The pronouns listed in Kähler (1940) are as follows:

Kähler notes that the form  is not often used and that  can have both dual (speaker + addressee) and plural (speaker + multiple addressees) reference. Enclitic pronouns, which typically express possessors, are subject nasal harmony, depending on whether the root that they attach to contains nasal or oral vowels. There is also a phonological process whereby a vowel is inserted between the glottal stop and the u in the 1sg enclitic -'u. This is the final vowel of the stem to which the suffix attaches, e.g.  'house' >  'my house',  'spear' >  'my spear'. Possession can also be indicated using the proclitic pronouns above.

The pronouns listed in Yoder (2011) are as follows:

Most of these appear to be Austronesian: Compare Malay 1sg , 1. , 1. , 2pl , 3sg/pl , and suffixes 1sg -ku, 2sg -mu, 3sg -nya, with *k, *t (d), *l, *m, *n having shifted to ’, k, r, b, d in Enggano, and with final consonants and (where possible) vowels being lost. The possessive suffixes appear on nouns, and they are often preceded by a vowel. Few forms are attested, but this vowel is i or ai after  (as with 'bag' in the phonology section), an echo vowel after several other consonants, and with several words not predictable on current evidence:  –  '(my) fishing rod'.

Nouns 
According to Kähler, nouns in Enggano can be subcategorised into three different classes: humans, proper nouns and common nouns. They take different articles to indicate singular and plural reference:

Blench notes that e- may be a determiner and Edwards argues that the articles not only mark noun class but also case. Nouns marked with e- and the other articles above can express both subjects and objects. The prefix e- can also be used to derive gerunds from verbal stems. Plural number can also be indicated through reduplication. In this case, the meaning is exhaustive, e.g. all of the nouns.

Nouns with an oblique function, e.g. those expressing nominal possessors, subjects of gerunds and any noun that follows the oblique marker , take the article u- in place of e-. Finally, locative nouns take the locative prefix i-.

Nouns in Enggano can be modified by demonstratives and relative clauses. As in other Austronesian languages, these typically follow the nominal head. There are three demonstratives in Enggano:

Relative clauses are introduced by a relativiser . Kähler suggests that older speakers of Enggano would use different relativisers depending on whether the head noun was singular or plural. However, in 1937 when he was conducting research, this practice was already uncommon in everyday language. An example of a relative clause in Enggano is given below. This shows that demonstratives also follow relative clauses:

Kähler describes some processes of nominal derivation in Enggano. Specifically, he notes that instrumental nouns can be formed via the addition of a vowel or paV- to a verbal root, e.g.  'to chisel' >  'a chisel' or  'to sew' >  'needle'. Locative nouns are formed with an -a suffix, e.g.  'gather' >  'gathering place'.

Verbs and Adjectives 
Adjectives commonly have prefixes ka-, ka’-, ki-; the first two are attested in derivation, and the last is assumed as it is very common and many such adjectives otherwise appear to be reduplicated, as in  'smooth' (Yoder 2011).

Verbs may have one or two prefixes and sometimes a suffix. According to Kähler, verbs are typically marked with the prefix ki- or bu- (allomorphs b-, mu-, m-, -ub-, -um-) or occur in bare form. Verbs modified with bu- occur in main clauses and take a set of agreement markers (§16). Kähler treats these as shortened pronouns. Verbs in bare form take a different set of agreement markers and occur following the negator keaba'a (§ 15). Kähler calls these 'modified forms'.

In addition to ki-, bu- and bare forms, Enggano verbs can take further derivational morphology:

 -i and -a'a applicative suffixes (see section 36 and 37 of the grammar)
 di- passive (see section 38 of the grammar)
 pa- causative (see section 39 and 40 of the grammar)
 aH- which Kähler describes as intensive but functions similarly to an antipassive (see section 42 of the grammar)
 a'a- which Kähler describes as stative but may act as a verbalizer of nominal roots (see section 45 of the grammar)
 aba- which Kähler describes as progressive but may reflect associated motion (see section 47 of the grammar).
 -a future tense or volitional marker (see section 51).

Attested prefixes in Yoder (2011) are ba-, ba’-, ia-, iah-, ka-, ka’-, kah-, ki-, kir-, ko-, pa-, pah-, ’a-. The functions of these are unknown. The three attested verbal suffixes are -i, -ar, -a’ (Yoder 2011).

Tense and Aspect 
Future tense is marked through an -a suffix. Past tense/perfective aspect is marked through the auxiliary verb hooː

Numerals 
The counting system is, or at least once was, vigesimal: Kähler recorded  'one man' = 20,  'five man' = 100,  'one our-body' = 400. (The last may be based on two people counting together: each time I count all twenty of my digits, you count one of yours, so that when you have counted all of your digits, the number is 20×20 = 400.) However, most people now use Malay numerals when speaking Enggano, especially for higher numbers. Yoder (2011) recorded the following:

1–5 are Austronesian, assuming ka- is a prefix on 'one' and ’a- is a prefix on 2–5. Compare the remaining -hai’, -ru, -kər, -up, -rib with Lampung əsay, rua, təlu, əpat, lima; *s, *t, *l, *m have shifted to h, k, r, b in Enggano, and final consonants and (simple) vowels have been lost. 
, 'seven', is 'five and two'. Yoder believes 10 may also be a verb, based on an unelicited root , as ki- and pa- are verbal prefixes (as in  'to give'); indeed, the apparent prefixes on 1–5 are identical to verbal prefixes as well.

Numbers above 10 and 20 are formed with  'and':  'ten and two' for 12,  'twenty and ten' for 30.  is 'person', so twenty is 'one person'.

References

Bibliography 

 Blench, Roger, The Enggano: archaic foragers and their interactions with the Austronesian world. Draft 11th August, 2014.
 
 Capell, Arthur, Bezirkssprachen im gebiet des UAN. In Gava’: Studies in Austronesian languages and cultures dedicated to Hans Kähler, ed. by Rainer Carle, Martina Heinschke, Peter Pink, Christel Rost, and Karen Stadtlander, 1–14, Berlin, Dietrich Reimer, 1982.
 
 Helfrich, O. L., Aanvullingen en verbeteringen op de Maleisch–Nederlansch–Enganeesch woordenlijst. Tijdschrift voor Indische Taal-, Land- en Volkenkunde 35:228–33, 1893.
 
 
 Nothofer, Bernd, The Barrier Island Languages in the Austronesian Language Family, Focal II: Papers From the Fourth International Conference on Austronesian Linguistics, pp. 87–109, Pacific Linguistics, Series C, No. 94, Canberra, Research School of Pacific and Asian Studies, The Australian National University, 1986.  
 Nothofer, Bernd, Lehnwörter Im Enggano, In Kölner Beiträge Aus Malaiologie Und Ethnologie Zu Ehren Von Professor Dr. Irene Hilgers-Hesse, ed. F. Schulze and Kurt Tauchmann, Kölner Südostasien Studien 1, Bonn: Holos, 1992
 Nothofer, Bernd, The relationship between the languages of the Barrier Islands and the Sulawesi-Philippine languages. In Language contact and change in the Austronesian world, ed. by Tom Dutton and Darrell Tryon, 389–409, Berlin, Mouton de Gruyter, 1994.

Further reading 

 Adelaar, Alexander, The Austronesian Languages of Asia and Madagascar: A Historical Perspective, The Austronesian Languages of Asia and Madagascar, pp. 1–42, Routledge Language Family Series, London, Routledge, 2005
 Dyen, Isidore, A lexicostatistical classification of the Austronesian languages. Indiana University Publications in Anthropology and Linguistics, 1965.
 Goesmali, S.Z, et al, Morfofonemik bahasa Enggano, Padang, Pusat Penelitian Universitas Andalas. Laporan Penelitian, 1989.
 Oudemans, J. A. C, Woordenlijst van de talen van Enggano, Mentawei en Nias, Tijdschrift voor Indische Taal-, Land- en Volkenkunde 25:484–88, 1879.
 Kähler, Hans, Texte von der Insel Enggano (Berichte über eine untergehende Kultur), Berlin, Dietrich Reimer, 1975.
 Kähler, Hans, Enggano-deutsches Wörterbuch, Veroffentlichungen Des Seminars Fur Indonesische Und Sudseesprachen Der Universitat Hamburg, Hamburg: Dietrich Reimer, 1987.
 Kaslim, Yuslina, et al, Pemetaan bahasa daerah di Sumatra Barat dan Bengkulu, Jakarta: Pusat Pembinaan dan Pengembangan Bahasa, 1987
 Nikelas, Syahwin, et al. Morfologi dan Sintaksis Bahasa Enggano, Jakarta, Pusat Pembinaan dan Pengembangan Bahasa, 1994.
 van de Noord, A., Enggano, In Holle lists: Vocabularies in languages of Indonesia, ed. by W. Stokhof, vol. 10/3, 189–205, Canberra, Pacific Linguistics, 1987.

External links
Language materials on Enggano
 Enggano at Ethnologue
 Enggano recordings

Languages of Indonesia
Sumatran languages
Malayo-Polynesian languages
Unclassified languages of Asia